Pacer, PACER or Pacers may refer to:

Arts, entertainment, and media
 Pacer (album), an album by The Amps
 Pacer (video game), a 2020 racing game
 Pacers, a band formed by Sonny Burgess
 The Pacer, a student newspaper circulated at the University of Tennessee

Brands and enterprises
 Pacer, a brand of mechanical pencil
 Pacers (confection), brand of mint-flavored confection
 Kramer Pacer, a series of kramer guitars made in the 1980s

Sports
 Pacer (dinghy), a type of small sail powered racing boat, formerly called Puffin Pacer
 Pacer, any horse that uses the pace gait, including:
 Canadian Pacer
 Narragansett Pacer
Standardbred
 Pacer, a fast bowler in cricket
 Derny cycle, a pacer used to maintain control in cycle racing
 Indiana Pacers, a basketball team in the United States
 Multi-stage fitness test, a personal endurance test involving running progressively faster: Progressive Aerobic Cardiovascular Endurance Run or "bleep test"
 Pace car, used to maintain control in autosport racing
 Pacemaker (running), athlete setting the pace for first section of a race
 Pacers, one of the two gaits in harness racing, for which the basketball team was named
 UNZA Pacers, a Zambian basketball team

Transportation
 Pacer (British Rail), a type of passenger railbus, used in the United Kingdom and the Middle East
 AMC Pacer, an American car produced by the American Motors Corporation
 Edsel Pacer, an American car produced by Ford
 Pacer International, a transportation logistic provider and the parent company of Pacer Stracktrain
 PA-22 Tri-Pacer, a tricycle gear variant of the PA-20 Pacer
 Pacer Stacktrain, a United States intermodal (container) freight transportation services company
 Piper PA-20 Pacer, a light airplane produced by Piper Aircraft

Other uses
 PACER (fusion), 1970s nuclear power project at Los Alamos National Laboratory in the United States
 PACER (law), a United States government legal documentation system standing for Public Access to Court Electronic Records
 Pacific Agreement on Closer Economic Relations, international trade cooperation agreement

See also
 Pace (disambiguation)